Kunmingella is genus of Cambrian bradoriid from the Chengjiang biota, containing the single species K. douvillei.

See also

 Arthropod
 Cambrian explosion
 Chengjiang biota
 List of Chengjiang Biota species by phylum

References

Cambrian animals
Maotianshan shales fossils
Prehistoric arthropod genera

Cambrian genus extinctions